Liniscus may refer to:
 Liniscus (nematode), a genus of nematodes in the family Capillariidae
 Liniscus, a genus of beetles in the family Chrysomelidae, synonym of Zohranus
 Liniscus, a genus of cnidarians in the family Linuchidae, synonym of Linuche